Oinoi is a village and a former community in the northern part of West Attica, Greece. The village was named Mazi until 1919. Since the 2011 local government reform it is part of the municipality Mandra-Eidyllia, of which it is a municipal unit. The municipal unit has an area of 14.431 km2.

The ancient site Oenoe is located about 3 km east of the modern settlement of Oinoi. Oinoi is surrounded by forested mountains, including Pateras and Pastra. There are farmlands in the valley areas.

Etymology
The name "Oinoi" has been known since antiquity, with Pausanias retelling one version, from the woman Oinoi, sister of the Epoch. (Pausanias, At. Κ. Λγ '§7).

History
Mazi had been planned to be served by a railway station as early as in 1883 in a preliminary study by the French Mission for the planned Piraeus - Demerli - Border railway.

Historical population

Transport

Road
The Greek National Road 3 (Eleusis - Thebes) passes through Oinoi.

Celebrations
In Oinoi, the feast of the Holy Trinity is celebrated on the day of the Holy Spirit in June, while in August the feast of Wine is celebrated. On the 15 August, a popular celebration is organized by the Landscaping Association of Panagitsa Mariza in the chapel of Panagia, while on 26 October it honors Agios Dimitrios in the old church of the patron saint of the village.

References

External links
Official website 
GTP Travel Pages (Municipality) (in English and Greek)

Populated places in West Attica